Albert Büchi (27 June 1907 – August 1988) was a Swiss professional road bicycle racer. He is mainly known for his bronze medal in the Elite race of the 1931 Road World Championships. He was also the Swiss National Road Race champion in 1931.

Major results

1930
  Amateur Road Race Champion
1931 - Oscar Egg
  Road Race Champion
 1st, GP de l'Echo d'Alger
  World Road Race Championship
 3rd, Züri-Metzgete
 9th, Tour de France
1932 - Oscar Egg
 1st, Sion-Lausanne-Sion
 1st, Tour du Canton de Genève
 2nd, National Road Race Championship
 4th, Züri-Metzgete
 11th, Tour de France
 11th, World Road Race Championship
1933
 1st, Stage 3, Tour de Savoie
 2nd, Tour de Suisse
 8th, World Road Race Championship
 8th, Züri-Metzgete
 13th, Tour de France
1934 - Dei
 1st, Circuit of Basel
 17th, Tour de France
1935
 10th, Tour de Suisse
 Winner Stage 7
1936
 3rd, National Road Race Championship

References

External links

1907 births
1988 deaths
Swiss male cyclists
People from Winterthur
Tour de Suisse stage winners
Sportspeople from the canton of Zürich